Imre Gellei (born 29 March 1950) is a Hungarian football manager and former player.

External links
Profile at Magyarfutball.hu

1950 births
Living people
Hungarian footballers
Association footballers not categorized by position
Hungarian football managers
Hungarian expatriate football managers
Zalaegerszegi TE managers
Győri ETO FC managers
BFC Siófok managers
Vasas SC managers
MTK Budapest FC managers
Ferencvárosi TC managers
Paksi FC managers
Expatriate football managers in Cyprus
Nemzeti Bajnokság I managers